The Bitou Local Municipality council consists of thirteen members elected by mixed-member proportional representation. Seven councillors are elected by first-past-the-post voting in seven wards, while the remaining six are chosen from party lists so that the total number of party representatives is proportional to the number of votes received. In the election of 18 May 2011 no party obtained a majority; the Democratic Alliance (DA) and the African National Congress (ANC) won six seats each, with the remaining seat going to the Congress of the People (COPE). The DA and COPE formed a coalition to govern the municipality.

The DA won a ward from the ANC in a by-election held in 2014, and governed Bitou alone with an outright majority of seats on the council.

A hung council was elected following the 2016 municipal elections, with the DA and ANC each winning six seats, and the final seat going to the Active United Front (AUF). The AUF chose to join forces with the ANC. However, six months later, in April 2017, the AUF announced that the partnership had fallen apart because the ANC had frustrated attempts to establish clean administration, had failed to commit resources to address problems, had not implemented the coalition agreement, and had not signed the agreed-upon service delivery plan. The DA and AUF negotiated for a month, following which the DA gained control of the municipality.

Results 
The following table shows the composition of the council after past elections.

December 2000 election

The following table shows the results of the 2000 election.

October 2002 floor crossing

In terms of the Eighth Amendment of the Constitution and the judgment of the Constitutional Court in United Democratic Movement v President of the Republic of South Africa and Others, in the period from 8–22 October 2002 councillors had the opportunity to cross the floor to a different political party without losing their seats.

In the Plettenberg Bay council, one councillor crossed from the Democratic Alliance (DA) to the New National Party (NNP), which had formerly been part of the DA, and another councillor left the DA to sit as an independent.

September 2004 floor crossing
Another floor-crossing period occurred on 1–15 September 2004, in which the NNP councillor crossed to the ANC.

March 2006 election

The following table shows the results of the 2006 election.

By-elections from May 2011 to August 2016
The following by-elections were held to fill vacant ward seats in the period between the elections in March 2006 and May 2011.

May 2011 election

The following table shows the results of the 2011 election.

By-elections from May 2011 to August 2016
The following by-elections were held to fill vacant ward seats in the period between the elections in May 2011 and August 2016.

August 2016 election

The following table shows the results of the 2016 election.

By-elections from August 2016 to November 2021 
The following by-elections were held to fill vacant ward seats in the period between the elections in August 2016 and November 2021.

November 2021 election

The following table shows the results of the 2021 election.

Notes

References

Bitou
Elections in the Western Cape